Parda may refer to:

 Lablab purpureus, a species of bean
 L-DOPA, a chemical also known by the trade name Parda
 Parda (grape), a Spanish wine grape
 Parda (surname), people with this name

See also
 Purdah, a religious and social practice of female seclusion prevalent among some Muslim and Hindu communities
 Purdah (film), 2018 Indian documentary against the practice
 Purdah (pre-election period), election rules in the United Kingdom